David Albert Mazouz (born ) is an American actor. He is best known for his leading role as Bruce Wayne in Fox's Batman-prequel TV drama Gotham (2014–2019). Mazouz started his acting career with several guest roles before joining the Fox TV series Touch (2012–2013), for which he was nominated for a Young Artist Award. He has had leading roles in the films The Games Maker and The Darkness.

Early life
Mazouz was born in Los Angeles, to a Sephardic Jewish family; his father Michel Mazouz is a medical doctor from Tunisia, and his mother Rachel Cohen is a psychotherapist whose parents are from Greece. He has a sister, Rebecca. He was a student at Shalhevet High School, a Modern Orthodox Jewish school, from 2015 to 2019 and appeared in a music video promoting the school. His Bar Mitzvah service was held at the Orthodox synagogue Young Israel of Century City in February 2014. In Fall 2019, he began attending Stanford University studying economics, psychology, and computer science in the Class of 2023

Career
Mazouz started his career in commercials at age 8. In 2012, he played the role of mute Jacob "Jake" Bohm in the TV series Touch. Mazouz has appeared in several television series including: Mike & Molly, Gotham, The Office, and Criminal Minds. He has also appeared in the ABC show Private Practice as the adopted brother of Betsy.

From 2014 to 2019, Mazouz portrayed a younger version of Bruce Wayne, and eventually the superhero Batman, in Fox's action-crime TV series Gotham. The show explored the young-to-teenage days and the transition to Batman of the famous DC Comics character, as well as the origins of its villains including Penguin, The Riddler, Poison Ivy, and The Joker.

In 2016, he had leading roles in the horror films The Darkness, as Michael Taylor, and Incarnate, as Cameron.

Filmography

Film

Television

Accolades

References

External links

 
 
 
 

2001 births
Living people
American male child actors
American male film actors
American male television actors
American male voice actors
Male actors from Los Angeles
Jewish American male actors
American people of Tunisian-Jewish descent
American people of Greek-Jewish descent
American people of French-Jewish descent
American Sephardic Jews
American Mizrahi Jews
21st-century American Jews